The Pasco Invitational is an annual track and field competition for high school athletes in the Pacific Northwest, held in mid April in Pasco, Washington.

The Invitational hosted its first event in 1962, ever since it has been the premier Track and Field event in the state of Washington. 

Most notable stars from the Pasco Invitational included Brad Walker, Ja'Warren Hooker, Anthony Buchanan, Chris Lukezic, and Ernie Conwell.

College track and field competitions in the United States
Sports in the Tri-Cities, Washington
Annual track and field meetings
Recurring sporting events established in 1962
High school track and field competitions in the United States
Pasco, Washington
Tourist attractions in Franklin County, Washington